Fairview Park may refer to:

Australia
Fairview Park, South Australia

Canada
CF Fairview Park (aka Fairview Park Mall), a shopping centre in Kitchener, Ontario

Hong Kong
Fairview Park (Hong Kong), a private residential estate in the New Territories, Hong Kong
Fairview Park (constituency)

Ireland
Fairview Park, Dublin, a city park in Dublin

United States
Fairview Park, Indiana
Fairview Park, Ohio
Fairview Park (Westmoreland County, Pennsylvania), a historic African American retreat center and recreation destination
Fairview Park (Seattle), a city park in Seattle
Fairview Park (dog racing track), former name of Multnomah Greyhound Park, in Oregon